The Cabinet of Rwanda consists of the Prime Minister, Ministers, Ministers of State and other members nominated by the President. Members of Cabinet are selected from political organisations based on the number of seats they hold in the Chamber of Deputies, but members of Cabinet cannot themselves belong to the Chamber.

Gender balance
The cabinet in 2018 is 50% women making Rwanda, with Ethiopia, the only two African countries with gender equality in their governments. President Paul Kagame reduced  the number of cabinet members from 31 to 26 in October 2018.

Members of Cabinet

Ministers of State

References

External links
Out goes the Old Guard: New faces and experience in Kagame’s government As of 20 October 2018.

Politics of Rwanda
Government of Rwanda
Rwanda